The 2013–14 season of the 2. Liga was the 21st season of the second-tier football league in Slovakia, since its establishment in 1993.

Twelve teams competed in the league, with bottom side will play the relegation play-offs.

Changes from last season

Team changes
DAC Dunajská Streda was promoted to the Slovak First Football League after the 2012–13 season.
1. FC Tatran Prešov was relegated from the Slovak First Football League after the 2012–13 season.
Spartak Trnava juniori and FK Pohronie were promoted from the Slovak Third Football League after the 2012–13 season.
 MFK Dolný Kubín and Ružiná were relegated to the Slovak Third Football League after the 2012–13 season.

Teams

Stadia and locations

League table

Relegation play-offs
MFK Tatran Liptovský Mikuláš, who finished 12th, faced ŠK Futura Humenné, the 10th-placed 2013–14 3. Liga (East) side for a one-legged play-off.

Final leg

Top goalscorers
Updated through matches played 31 May 2014.

See also
2013–14 Slovak First Football League
2013–14 3. Liga (Slovakia)

Stats 
 List of transfers summer 2013

References

External links
 League table, recent results and upcoming fixtures at Soccerway

2013-14
Slovak
2